Man of the Moment is a 1935 British comedy film directed by Monty Banks and starring Douglas Fairbanks Jr., Laura La Plante and Margaret Lockwood. It was made at Teddington Studios by the British subsidiary of Warner Brothers. The film's art direction was by Peter Proud.

This was the first film shown on BBC Television on 12 September 1938.

Plot
Office worker Mary Briany (Laura La Plante) finds out she is being demoted by the boss she secretly loves in order to make room for his girlfriend. She tries to commit suicide by jumping into the river. Tony Woodward (Douglas Fairbanks Jr.) is driving by and rescues her, much to her annoyance.

He takes her back to his mansion, but he and his butler Godfrey (Donald Calthrop) have great difficulty getting her to behave. Meanwhile, Tony is to be married the next day to childish heiress Vera Barton (Margaret Lockwood). She reveals to Tony's friend Lord Rufus Paul (Claude Hulbert) that she plans to change Tony's lifestyle completely - no more smoking or drinking. Her millionaire father (Peter Gawthorne) promises his nearly penniless future son-in-law 5000 pounds to pay for a partnership in a company.

Later, Mary crashes Tony's bachelor party, dressed as a man in his younger brother's clothes. The next day, Vera and her father find Tony, Mary, and his friends passed out on the floor. As a result, Vera breaks off the wedding.

With only £300 and deeply in debt, Tony proposes a suicide pact to Mary. They will fly to Monte Carlo to try to win a fortune at the casino. If they lose, they will kill themselves. The first day does not go well. They are ready to jump off a cliff when a gentleman finds them and gives them £20 they did not know they had won. On their second chance, they split up to gamble. Tony loses, but Mary has an incredible lucky streak and wins a large amount of money.

Meanwhile, Vera decides she wants to marry Tony after all. Rufus brings news about Tony's whereabouts, and they go to Monte Carlo. Vera embraces Tony before Mary can tell him the good news. Heartbroken, Mary climbs out on the hotel ledge, but Tony finds her and tells her he loves her. (Annoyed at being jilted, Vera decides that she wants to marry a man that no other woman would desire; she picks Rufus.)

Cast

Production
The film was one of a number that Douglas Fairbanks Jr. made in England. It was produced by Irving Asher of Warner Brothers, who had a brief to make 20 films year under the British quota system. Asher had helped finance some films Fairbanks Jr. produced in England for his own company; in return for the loan, Fairbanks Jr. agreed to appear in the next film Asher produced, which turned out to be Man of the Moment. His co-star, Laura La Plante, was married to Asher. The films failed and Fairbanks was broke.

Fairbanks later wrote:
Professionally, Man of the Moment was not at all what I should have done in that period. But Irving hoped that with my name and Laura's, a good supporting cast and direction by an ex-Hollywood comedian whimsically named Monty Banks, Warners would overlook the picture's quota category and release it in the States and Canada. Although they never did, I had the best time imaginable making the movie.
It was an early role for Margaret Lockwood.

Reception
The film never was released in the U.S.

References

Bibliography
 Low, Rachael. Filmmaking in 1930s Britain. George Allen & Unwin, 1985.
 Wood, Linda. British Films, 1927-1939. British Film Institute, 1986.

External links 
 
 
 Man of the Moment offered for download at free-classic-movies.com

1935 films
1935 romantic comedy films
1930s English-language films
British black-and-white films
British romantic comedy films
British films based on plays
Films directed by Monty Banks
Films set in London
Films set in Windsor, Berkshire
Films set in Monaco
Films shot at Teddington Studios
Films about gambling
Warner Bros. films
1930s British films